The Acciaio-class submarine (also sometimes called Platino class) was the fifth subclass of the 600 Series of coastal submarines built by the Regia Marina. They were completed during the early 1940s and saw service in World War II.

Design and description
Of the 13 vessels in the class, six were built by CRDA at Monfalcone, four by OTO at Muggiano, and three by Cantieri Tosi in Taranto, the three main Italian shipyards for submarines.

The word Acciaio means "steel", and all vessels in this class were named for metals and minerals.

Ships

Service
Of the 13 vessels completed, eight were lost in action. The submarines served in the Mediterranean.

See also
 Italian submarines of World War II

References

Notes

Bibliography

External links
 Acciaio class at regiamarina.net
 Sommergibili Marina Militare website

  

 Acciaio
 Acciaio
 
Acciaio
Ships built by Cantieri navali Tosi di Taranto
Ships built by Cantieri Riuniti dell'Adriatico
Ships built by OTO Melara